The 1964 Gillette Cup was the second Gillette Cup, an English limited overs county cricket tournament. It was held between 25 April and 5 September 1964, and was won by the defending champions Sussex.

Summary

First round

Second round

Quarter-finals

Semi-finals

Final

References

External links
1964 Gillette Cup  from CricketArchive

1964
Gillette Cup, 1964